Christian Reichert (born 7 February 1985) is a German swimmer. Since 2011, he participates in the open water events.

He won the gold medal in the Team event at the 2013 World Aquatics Championships in Barcelona alongside his teammates Thomas Lurz and Isabelle Härle.

At the 2016 Summer Olympics in Rio de Janeiro, he competed in the men's 10 km marathon swim. He finished in 9th place with a time of 1:53:04.7.

References

External links 
 
 
 
 
 

1985 births
Living people
German male swimmers
Male long-distance swimmers
World Aquatics Championships medalists in open water swimming
Olympic swimmers of Germany
Swimmers at the 2016 Summer Olympics
Sportspeople from Würzburg
20th-century German people
21st-century German people